Beverly Swerling (1938 – 3 December 2018) was an American writer of historical fiction.

Biography
Born in Boston, Beverly Swerling grew up in nearby Revere, Massachusetts living with her parents in the boarding house they ran. After attending college in Kansas City (MO) Swerling relocated to New York City to pursue a writing career, working at an insurance agency until established as a freelance journalist. For a time Swerling was the director of a Boston-area halfway house for female ex-cons, an experience which formed the basis of her first published book: The Love Seekers, a work of non-fiction published in 1966. The Love Seekers was credited to Beverly Byrne, which name was also utilized in Swerling's journalistic bylines, Byrne having become Swerling's surname via a brief marriage during a European sojourn.

In 1978, Swerling emigrated, accompanied by William F Martin (born 27 August 1926) of Manhattan whom she had recently married: the couple would live abroad for some twenty-five years, originally on the Isle of Wight and eventually on Lanzarote and on a houseboat in France. It was during this period that Swerling became a published novelist with her debut novel: the whodunit Murder on the Menu, being issued in 1980 as was Jemma, the last-named moving Swerling into the historical fiction genre which would be the mainstay of her novelistic output. These first two novels were both softcover originals credited to Beverly Byrne: among eight subsequent softcovers "Beverly Byrne" had two novels published in hardcover: Women's Rites (1985) and A Matter of Time (1987), and in 1989 Swerling had a third hardcover novel: Juffie Kane published, that book being credited to Beverly S. Martin. A second Beverly S. Martin novel: Mollie Pride, was published in softcover in 1991.

Almost ten years after the 1992 publication of her final novel as Beverly Byrne, Swerling - now returned to New York City with her husband - had her first novel written as Beverly Swerling appear in 2001, that being City of Dreams, the first of four novels set in New York City from its 17th century founding til the "Gilded Age": all four novels were originally published as hardcovers, as were two other Beverly Swerling novels. Having moved from New York City to Philadelphia with her husband, Swerling subsequent to her husband's 29 January 2015 demise spent her final years in Woodbury (CT), where she died 3 December 2018 due to pancreatic cancer.

Publications
as Beverly Byrne
ALL TITLES ARE ORIGINAL SOFTCOVERS IF NOT OTHERWISE NOTED
The Love Seekers (1966) (hardcover) 
Murder on the Menu (1980)  
Jemma (1980)  
The Outcast: The Griffin Saga Vol 1 (1981)  
The Adventurer: The Griffin Saga Vol 2 (1982)  (aka Fiery Splendor)
Women's Rites (1985) hardcover : softcover  
Jason's People (1985)  
A Matter of Time (1987) hardcover : softcover  
Come Sunrise (1987)  
The Morgan Women (1990)  
A Lasting Fire (1991)  (UK edition in hardcover with )
The Flames of Vengeance (1991)  (UK edition in hardcover with )
The Firebirds (1991)  (UK edition in hardcover with )

as Beverly S. Martin
Juffie Kane (1989) hardcover : softcover  
Mollie Pride (1991) 

as Beverly Swerling
ALL TITLES ORIGINALLY PUBLISHED IN HARDCOVER
 trade paperback edition issued 2002 According to WorldCat, the book is held in 798 libraries  
 (connected with series) trade paperback edition issued 2005
 trade paperback edition issued 2008

2013 Bristol House (NL, Tempelcode) 
 According to WorldCat, the book is held in 798 libraries  
 (connected with series)

 trade paperback editio issued 2009
 trade paperback edition issued 2012
2013 Bristol House (NL, Tempelcode)  trade paperback edition issued 2014

References

External links
Beverly Swerling's official website

1938 births
2018 deaths
American historical novelists
American women novelists
Women historical novelists
20th-century American novelists
20th-century American women writers
21st-century American women